Photuris fairchildi is a species of firefly in the beetle family Lampyridae. It is found in North America.This species is known to use aggressive mimicry in order to lure in and prey upon the males of other species of firefly. This species inhabits marshes, spruce forests, and other low swampy areas.

References

Further reading
 

Articles created by Qbugbot
Beetles described in 1951
Photuris